Eugen Beyer (18 February 1882 in Pohrlitz (Moravia) – 25 July 1940 in Salzburg) was an Austrian Feldmarschalleutnant in the 1930s and Wehrmacht General of the Infantry during the early years of the Second World War.

From 1935 to 1938, Beyer was commander of the Bundesheer's 6th Division (stationed in Innsbruck). After the Anschluss he was incorporated into the Wehrmacht where he was given command of XVIII Corps, a post he held until shortly before his death. He was the most senior Austrian officer to transfer to the German Army.

Promotions

Decorations & awards
 Iron Cross (1914), 2nd class
 Military Jubilee Cross 1848-1908
 Military Merit Cross, 3rd class with war decoration and swords (Austria-Hungary)
 Order of the Iron Crown, 3rd class with war decoration and swords (Austria)
 Silver Military Merit Medal ("Signum Laudis") with swords (Austria-Hungary)
 Bronze Military Merit Medal ("Signum Laudis") with swords (Austria-Hungary)
 Austrian War Commemorative Medal with Swords
 Honour Cross of the World War 1914/1918
 Decoration of Honour in Gold for Services to the Republic of Austria

1882 births
1940 deaths
People from Pohořelice
People from the Margraviate of Moravia
Moravian-German people
Austro-Hungarian Army officers
Austrian lieutenant field marshals
German Army generals of World War II
Generals of Infantry (Wehrmacht)
Austro-Hungarian military personnel of World War I
Recipients of the Iron Cross (1914), 2nd class
Recipients of the Decoration of Honour for Services to the Republic of Austria
Deaths from cancer in Austria
Austrian people of Moravian-German descent
Austrian military personnel of World War II